Russell Tully (30 September 1949 – 2 February 2013) was  a former Australian rules footballer who played with Richmond in the Victorian Football League (VFL).

References

External links 		
		
		
				
		
		
1949 births		
2013 deaths		
Australian rules footballers from Victoria (Australia)		
Richmond Football Club players
Oakleigh Football Club players